{{Infobox song
| name       = Feels like Home
| cover      =
| alt        =
| type       = single
| artist     = Chantal Kreviazuk
| album      = Songs from Dawson's Creek and How to Lose a Guy in 10 Days (soundtrack)
| released   = 1999
| recorded   =
| studio     =
| venue      =
| genre      =
| length     = 4:42
| label      = Columbia
| writer     = Randy Newman
| producer   =
| prev_title = Leaving on a Jet Plane
| prev_year  = 1998
| next_title = Before You
| next_year  = 1999
}}

"Feels like Home" is a song written by Randy Newman for the musical Randy Newman's Faust, in which Bonnie Raitt sang it.  Linda Ronstadt, also involved in the musical, recorded it for Trio II in 1994 and released it on her solo album Feels like Home in March 1995.  Raitt's version was released on the musical's album soundtrack in September 1995 and was also used the following year in the soundtrack to the film Michael.  Linda Ronstadt's original version, with Emmylou Harris and Dolly Parton, the latter of whom was mixed out of Ronstadt's original release due to label disputes, was released in 1999.

The most successful version of the song was a version sung by Chantal Kreviazuk and released as a single from the 1999 soundtrack Songs from Dawson's Creek. The Kreviazuk version reached the top 40 in Ireland and the top 20 in the Canadian adult contemporary chart, and was later included on some editions of her 2002 album What If It All Means Something.

Personnel (Randy Newman version)
Randy Newman - vocals, piano
Bonnie Raitt - vocals
Mark Goldenberg - guitar
Doug Livingston - pedal steel
Benmont Tench - Hammond B-3 organ
Randy Waldman - synthesizer
James Hutchinson - bass
Kenny Aronoff - drums

Other versions
Various other artists have recorded the song, including:
Randy Newman for his 2008 album Harps and Angels, as well as live versions in the 1998 box set Guilty: 30 Years of Randy Newman and the 2011 album Live in LondonMario Frangoulis for his 2008 album Mario & Friends: What a Wonderful WorldEdwina Hayes for her 2008 album Pour Me A Drink and the soundtrack to the film My Sister's KeeperJosh Groban for some editions of his 2010 album IlluminationsNeil Diamond for his 2010 album DreamsJai McDowall for his 2011 album BelieveAled Jones for his 2011 album ForeverKatie Melua for her 2012 album Secret Symphony Bonus Edition.
Charlotte Jaconelli for her 2014 album SolitaireDiana Krall and Bryan Adams for Krall's 2015 album WallflowerJudy Collins and Jackson Browne for Collins' 2015 album Strangers AgainInger Marie Gundersen for her 2018 album Feels Like Home''
Raul Malo and Martina McBride for his album "You're Only Lonely"

Charts (Chantal Kreviazuk version)

References

Songs written by Randy Newman
Randy Newman songs
1999 singles
Chantal Kreviazuk songs
1995 songs
Bonnie Raitt songs
Linda Ronstadt songs
Columbia Records singles